Oskars is a Latvian masculine given name; a variant of the name Oscar. and may refer to:
Oskars Bārs (1848-1914), Latvian architect
Oskars Bārtulis (born 1987), Latvian professional ice hockey defenceman
Oskars Cibuļskis (born 1988), Latvian professional ice hockey defenceman 
Oskars Dankers (1883–1965), Latvian general 
Oskars Gudramovičs (born 1988), Latvian luger and Olympic competitor
Oskars Kalpaks (1882–1919), Latvian military commander 
Oskars Kastēns (born 1971), Latvian journalist and a politician 
Oskars Ķibermanis (born 1993), Latvian bobsledder and Olympic competitor
Oskars Kļava (born 1983), Latvian football defender
Oskars Melbārdis (born 1988), Latvian bobsledder 
Oskars Perro (1918–2003), Latvian soldier and writer

References

Latvian masculine given names